Tianbei station is a station on Line 3 and Line 7 of the Shenzhen Metro. The Line 3 platforms opened on 28 June 2011 and the Line 7 platforms opened on 28 October 2016. It is located on Cuizhu Road.

Station layout

Exits

References

External links
 Shenzhen Metro Tianbei Station (Line 3) (Chinese)
 Shenzhen Metro Tianbei Station (Line 3) (English)
 Shenzhen Metro Tianbei Station (Line 7) (Chinese)
 Shenzhen Metro Tianbei Station (Line 7) (English)

Shenzhen Metro stations
Railway stations in Guangdong
Luohu District
Railway stations in China opened in 2011